Senecio abruptus, or the yellow starvation ragwort, is a species of plant that is endemic to South Africa.

Description 
The leaves range from an elongated oval to toothed to having slightly feathery margins. The base of each leaf may be lobed. The small yellow flowers grow in disc shaped flowerheads. They are present between July and November.

Distribution and habitat 
This plant grows on stony slopes between the Cape Peninsula and Clanwilliam in South Africa.

References 

Plants described in 1800
Flora of South Africa
abruptus